Albert William Parry (15 October 1874 – 18 September 1950) was a Welsh clergyman who served as the eighth Dean of St David's between 1940 and 1949 and Editor of Y Llan and Church News, the newspaper of the Church in Wales.

He was born in Carmel, Flintshire, Wales, and educated at St David's College, Lampeter and St Michael's Theological College, Llandaff. He was Curate of St John's Church, Cardiff and then lecturer, tutor and finally professor of education at St Luke's College, Exeter. From 1908 until his accession to the deanery in 1940 he was principal of Trinity College, Carmarthen. During this time he was also a Chaplain to the Forces attached to the South Wales Infantry Brigade.

He died in Haverfordwest, Pembrokeshire, Wales.

References

External links
 
 

1874 births
1950 deaths
People associated with Trinity University College
Welsh Anglicans
Deans of St Davids
Welsh military chaplains
World War II chaplains